The U.S. Highways in South Dakota are the segments of the United States Numbered Highway System owned and maintained by the South Dakota Department of Transportation in the US state of South Dakota.


List

Special routes

See also

References

External links

 
US